Tex Hoy (born 4 November 1999) is an Australian professional rugby league footballer who plays as a  and  for Hull F.C. in the Super League.

He previously played for the Newcastle Knights in the National Rugby League.

Background
Born in Newcastle, New South Wales, Hoy played his junior rugby league for the South Newcastle Lions, before being signed by the Newcastle Knights.

Hoy is the son of former professional surfer Matt Hoy.

Playing career

Early years
Hoy started playing for the Knights' Harold Matthews Cup team in 2015, the S. G. Ball Cup side in 2016 and then the Jersey Flegg Cup team in 2018. In 2019, he played the majority of the year with the Knights' Canterbury Cup NSW team. In July 2019, he extended his contract with the Knights until the end of the 2021 season, before playing for the New South Wales Under-20's rugby league team.

2020
In February, Hoy was promoted to the Knights' top 30 NRL squad. In round 3 of the 2020 NRL season, he made his NRL debut for the Knights against the Penrith Panthers.

2022
In July, Hoy signed a two-year contract with English Super League side Hull F.C. starting in 2023.

References

External links
Newcastle Knights profile

1999 births
Living people
Australian rugby league players
Australian expatriate sportspeople in England
Hull F.C. players
Newcastle Knights players
South Newcastle Lions players
Rugby league fullbacks
Rugby league five-eighths
Rugby league players from Newcastle, New South Wales